Malanichi is a rural locality (a village) in Chernushinsky District, Perm Krai, Russia. The population was 39 as of 2010. There is 1 street.

Geography 
Malanichi is located 10 km north of Chernushka (the district's administrative centre) by road. Ananyino is the nearest rural locality.

References 

Rural localities in Chernushinsky District